Jhon van Beukering (born 29 September 1983) is a former professional footballer who played as a striker. Born in the Netherlands, he made one appearance for the Indonesia national team.

Club career

Vitesse 
Born in the Netherlands, van Beukering started playing for local amateur sides, before Vitesse Arnhem saw his talent, and signed him to Vitesse's youth academy after some strong displays in the youth team of De Graafschap. In the 2000–01 season he made his debut for Vitesse's main squad. Van Beukering scored two goals in the three games he played that season. The next season, he got a place in the starting lineup for the club and scored three goals.

In the 2002–03 season he only made six appearances, and as a result he was loaned out to FC Zwolle. In Zwolle he also played six games, scoring two goals. The next season, his loan spell at FC Zwolle was extended, and Van Beukering made three goals in 14 games.

De Graafschap 
Van Beukering returned to his former club De Graafschap in the winter break. With nine goals in 11 games he played an important part in De Graafschap's promotion to the Eredivisie at the end of the 2003–04 season. In the Eredivisie he played 31 games for De Graafschap, scoring 9 goals. At the end of the season he sustained a heavy knee injury and he couldn't play for more than half a year.

De Graafschap, meanwhile relegated, could use Van Beukering again after the first half season in the Eerste Divisie. Van Beukering began scoring goals soon after returning from his injury.

NEC 
He was snapped up by NEC in summer 2007 after he chose the club over RKC Waalwijk in January 2007 with NEC manager Mario Been praising his prolific goalscoring.

In summer 2009 van Beukering was loaned to former club De Graafschap.

Feyenoord 
In December 2010 he signed a contract with Dutch giants Feyenoord. He became infamous for his lack of speed, with then Feyenoord manager Mario Been jokingly accusing headwind after van Beukering showed a very slow sprint in his first game. At NEC he had already earned the nickname Jhonny of the Burger King due to him being frequently overweight.

Pelita Jaya 
After an unsuccessful stint with Feyenoord, he left the club for Indonesian club Pelita Jaya.

In 2013 he played for the amateur team MASV in Arnhem, for which was also the assistant manager. In October 2016, his brother Dennis stated that van Beukering was in training to become a professional player once more.

International career 
Van Beukering played several times for the Netherlands youth teams. During his time playing in Indonesia he was invited to become an Indonesia citizen. He was called up to play against Uruguay but unable to play due to Indonesian regulations which does not allow dual nationalities. He was sworn in as a naturalized Indonesian citizen on 10 October 2011, making him eligible to play for the Indonesia national team.

His first unofficial debut with the Indonesia national team was when they challenged Timor-Leste in Gelora Bung Karno Stadium 14 November 2012. He assisted Bambang Pamungkas for the only goal in the game. He made his official international debut on 1 December 2012, in 2012 AFF Suzuki Cup against Malaysia.

Career statistics

Honours 

De Graafschap
 Eerste Divisie: 2006–07, 2009–10

References

External links 
 

1983 births
Living people
People from Rheden
Dutch people of Indonesian descent
Association football forwards
Dutch footballers
Indonesian footballers
Indonesia international footballers
Indonesian expatriate footballers
SBV Vitesse players
PEC Zwolle players
De Graafschap players
NEC Nijmegen players
Go Ahead Eagles players
Feyenoord players
Pelita Jaya FC players
FC Dordrecht players
Expatriate footballers in Indonesia
Naturalised citizens of Indonesia
Footballers from Gelderland